Coptosoma elegans is a species belonging to the family Plataspidae, subfamily Plataspinae. It is often confused for a beetle due to its appearance, but it is a true bug.

References

External links 
 Coptosoma elegans at insectoid.info

Shield bugs
Insects described in 1876